The COVID-19 pandemic in Gabon is part of the ongoing worldwide pandemic of coronavirus disease 2019 caused by severe acute respiratory syndrome coronavirus 2. The virus was confirmed to have reached Gabon in March 2020.


Background 
On 12 January 2020, the World Health Organization (WHO) confirmed that a novel coronavirus was the cause of a respiratory illness in a cluster of people in Wuhan City, Hubei Province, China, which was reported to the WHO on 31 December 2019.

The case fatality ratio for COVID-19 has been much lower than SARS of 2003, but the transmission has been significantly greater, with a significant total death toll.

Timeline

March 2020
 The country's first case was announced on 12 March, a 27-year-old Gabonese man who returned to Gabon from France, four days prior to confirmation of the coronavirus.

 On 17 March, two additional cases were confirmed in the country, including a woman who works at the Ministry of Foreign Affairs. She visited Marseille and Paris before returning to the country.

 On 20 March, the first death was confirmed.

 On 24 March, diagnosed cases increased to six with the Ministry of Health announcing two new cases: a 45-year-old Togolese national and resident of Gabon who recently returned from Senegal on 11 March, and a 42-year-old Gabonese national who returned from France on 19 March.

 During the month there were 7 confirmed cases, one death and six active cases at the end of the month.

April to June 2020
 There were 269 new cases in April, raising the total number of cases to 276. The death toll tripled to 3. There were 67 recoveries, leaving 206 active cases at the end of the month.

 In May there were 2,379 new cases, raising the total number of cases to 2,655. The death toll rose to 17. The number of recovered patients increased to 722, leaving 1,916 active cases at the end of the month.

 In June there were 2,739 new cases, bringing the total number of cases to 5,394. The death toll rose to 42. The number of recovered patients increased to 2,420, leaving 2,932 active cases at the end of the month.

July to September 2020
 In July, Gabon suspended visas for all European travelers after being excluded from an EU list of countries whose citizens can make non-essential trips to the region.

 There were 1,958 new cases in July, raising the total number of confirmed cases to 7,352. The death toll rose by seven to 49. The number of recovered patients more than doubled to 4,943, leaving 2,360 active cases at the end of the month (a decrease by 19.5% from the end of June).

 There were 1,181 new cases in August, raising the total number of confirmed cases to 8,533. The death toll rose to 53. There were 1,216 active cases at the end of the month.

 There were 219 new cases in September, bringing the total number of confirmed cases to 8,752. The death toll rose to 54. The number of recovered patients increased to 7,955, leaving 743 active cases at the end of the month.

October to December 2020
 There were 216 new cases in October, bringing the total number of confirmed cases to 8,968. The death toll rose to 55. The number of recovered patients increased to 8,698, leaving 215 active cases at the end of the month.

 There were 246 new cases in November, bringing the total number of confirmed cases to 9,214. The death toll rose to 60. The number of recovered patients increased to 9,066, leaving 88 active cases at the end of the month. Model-based simulations show that the 95% confidence interval for the time-varying reproduction number R t was stable around 1.0 from November to January.

 There were 357 new cases in December, taking the total number of confirmed cases to 9,571. The death toll rose to 64. The number of recovered patients increased to 9,388, leaving 119 active cases at the end of the month.

January to March 2021
 There were 1,177 new cases in January, taking the total number of confirmed cases to 10,748. The death toll rose to 68. The number of recovered patients increased to 10,260, leaving 420 active cases at the end of the month.

 There were 3,816 new cases in February, taking the total number of confirmed cases to 14,564. The death toll rose to 83. The number of recovered patients increased to 13,143, leaving 1,338 active cases at the end of the month.

 Vaccination began on 23 March, initially with 100,000 doses of the Sinopharm BIBP vaccine donated by China. There were 4,986 new cases in March, taking the total number of confirmed cases to 19,550. The death toll rose to 118. The number of recovered patients increased to 16,609, leaving 2,823 active cases at the end of the month. 2,433 persons were vaccinated in March.

April to June 2021
 There were 3,525 new cases in April, taking the total number of confirmed cases to 23,075. The death toll rose to 139. The number of recovered patients increased to 19,629, leaving 3,307 active cases at the end of the month.

 There were 1,354 new cases in May, taking the total number of confirmed cases to 24,429. The death toll rose to 152. The number of recovered patients increased to 22,118, leaving 2,159 active cases at the end of the month.

 There were 625 new cases in June, taking the total number of confirmed cases to 25,054. The death toll rose to 159. The number of recovered patients increased to 24,729, leaving 166 active cases at the end of the month.

July to September 2021
 There were 330 new cases in July, taking the total number of confirmed cases to 25,384. The death toll rose to 164. The number of recovered patients increased to 25,166, leaving 54 active cases at the end of the month.

 There were 504 new cases in August, bringing the total number of confirmed cases to 25,888. The death toll rose to 166. The number of recovered patients increased to 25,625, leaving 97 active cases at the end of the month.

 There were 4,760 new cases in September, raising the total number of confirmed cases to 30,648. The death toll rose to 190. The number of recovered patients increased to 26,947, leaving 3,511 active cases at the end of the month.

October to December 2021
 There were 4,877 new cases in October, raising the total number of confirmed cases to 35,525. The death toll rose to 239. The number of recovered patients increased to 28,889, leaving 6,397 active cases at the end of the month.

 There were 1,866 new cases in November, bringing the total number of confirmed cases to 37,391. The death toll rose to 279. The number of recovered patients increased to 32,693, leaving 4,419 active cases at the end of the month.

 There were 4,407 new cases in December, raising the total number of confirmed cases to 41,798. The death toll rose to 288. The number of recovered patients increased to 37,499, leaving 4,011 active cases at the end of the month. Modelling by WHO's Regional Office for Africa suggests that due to under-reporting, the true cumulative number of infections by the end of 2021 was around one million while the true number of COVID-19 deaths was around 323.

January to March 2022
 There were 4,924 new cases in January, raising the total number of confirmed cases to 46,722. The death toll rose to 301. The number of recovered patients increased to 41,798, leaving 4,623 active cases at the end of the month.

 There were 829 new cases in February, bringing the total number of confirmed cases to 47,551. The death toll rose to 303. The number of recovered patients increased to 46,859, leaving 389 active cases at the end of the month.

 There were 35 new cases in March, bringing the total number of confirmed cases to 47,586. The death toll remained unchanged. The number of recovered patients increased to 47,266, leaving 17 active cases at the end of the month.

April to June 2022
 There were 416 new cases in April, raising the total number of confirmed cases to 47,602. The death toll rose to 304. The number of recovered patients increased to 47,285, leaving 13 active cases at the end of the month.

 There were 48 new cases in May, raising the total number of confirmed cases to 47,650. The death toll remained unchanged.

 There were 289 new cases in June, raising the total number of confirmed cases to 47,939. The death toll rose to 305. The number of recovered patients increased to 47,353, leaving 281 active cases at the end of the month.

July to September 2022
 There were 572 new cases in July, raising the total number of confirmed cases to 48,511. The death toll rose to 306.
 There were 138 new cases in August, raising the total number of confirmed cases to 48,649. The death toll remained unchanged.
 There were 64 new cases in September, raising the total number of confirmed cases to 48,713. The death toll remained unchanged. The number of recovered patients increased to 48,307, leaving 100 active cases at the end of the month.

October to December 2022
 There were 232 new cases in October, raising the total number of confirmed cases to 48,945. The death toll remained unchanged.
 There were 28 new cases in November, raising the total number of confirmed cases to 48,973. The death toll remained unchanged. The number of recovered patients increased to 48,617, leaving 50 active cases at the end of the month.
 There were seven new cases in December, raising the total number of confirmed cases to 48,980. The death toll remained unchanged. The number of recovered patients increased to 48,668, leaving six active cases at the end of the month.

Statistics
 Confirmed new cases per day 

 Confirmed deaths per day

See also 
 COVID-19 pandemic in Africa
 COVID-19 pandemic by country and territory

References

COVID-19 pandemic
COVID-19 pandemic
Gabon
Gabon
Disease outbreaks in Gabon